Marcia France is an American academic and university administrator currently serving as the inaugural Dean of Undergraduate Studies at Duke Kunshan University in China. Prior to her appointment, she served as an associate provost and John T. Herwick, M.D. Professor of Chemistry at Washington and Lee University, where she is currently on a five-year leave.

France received degrees in chemistry from the Massachusetts Institute of Technology and Yale University, and her PhD in organic chemistry from the California Institute of Technology.

France taught at W&L from 1994 to 2018. She was appointed as Dean at Duke Kunshan on August 1, 2018, and has overseen the launch of the university's undergraduate program.

Selected works 

 A Series of Well‐Defined Metathesis Catalysts–Synthesis of [RuCl2(CHR′)(PR3)2] and Its Reactions Angewandte Chemie, 1995
 The carbonyl ene reaction Tetrahedron, 2008

References 

Living people
Yale University alumni
Massachusetts Institute of Technology alumni
California Institute of Technology alumni
American women chemists
20th-century American chemists
20th-century American women scientists
20th-century American academics
21st-century American chemists
21st-century American women scientists
21st-century American academics
American women academics
Women deans (academic)